Tecuci is a city in Galați County, Romania, in the historical region of Western Moldavia. It is situated among wooded hills, on the right bank of the Bârlad River, and at the junction of railways from Galați, Bârlad, and Mărășești.

History
The area neighboring Tecuci was the scene of a fierce battle in 1476 between Moldavian Prince Stephen the Great and the Ottomans.

Under the Kingdom of Romania, it was the residence of the now-defunct Tecuci County.

Economy
The city was famous for its canned food factories, which preserve vegetables, fruit and meat, as well as for its mustard factories.

Climate

Climate in Tecuci is defined as Dfb (Humid continental climate with warm summers), bordering a Dfa (Humid continental climate with hot summers).

Population

As of 31 November 2021, 31,045 inhabitants live within the city limits.

Natives
 Nina Arbore (1888–1942), painter and illustrator
 Mihai Berza (1907–1978), historian
 Elena Caragiani-Stoenescu (1887–1929), first woman aviator in Romania
 Henri Cihoski (1872–1950), politician and general
 Vintilă Dongoroz (1893–1976), jurist, lawyer and professor
 Alina Gorghiu (b. 1978), lawyer and former president of the National Liberal Party (PNL)
 Calistrat Hogaș (1847–1917), writer
 Iorgu Iordan (1888–1986), linguist, philologist and communist politician
 Mihail Manoilescu (1891–1950), publicist, economist, and politician
 Henri Moscovici (b. 1944), mathematician
 Alexandru Papadopol-Calimah (1833–1898), historian, politician, and academician
 Gheorghe Petrașcu (1872–1949), painter and academician
 N. Petrașcu (1859–1944), diplomat, writer, memoirist, publicist, art historian and critic
 Ion Petrovici (1882–1972), philosopher, essayist, memoirist, writer, orator and politician
 Theodor Șerbănescu (1839–1901), poet and translator

Museums 
 Tecuci Town Museum

Festivals
Tecuci is the host of several cultural festivals:
 International Aphorism Festival
 Costache Conachi Poetry Festival
 Omătuța traditional folk music festival

References

 
Populated places in Galați County
Cities in Romania
Capitals of former Romanian counties
Localities in Western Moldavia